KRVQ-FM (104.5 FM) is a radio station that is licensed to and serves Lake Isabella, California, United States. The station is owned by Craig and Patricia Lutz, through licensee Alta Sierra Broadcasting LLC. KRVQ-FM has been silent since June 23, 2016; prior to this, it broadcast a classic rock format.

History
The station first signed on in 1992 as KVLI-FM, simulcasting the adult standards of its sister station KVLI. In June 1997, Robert J. Bohn and Katherine M. Bohn purchased KVLI-AM-FM for $240,000. The new owners flipped both stations to oldies that September.

In August 2014, the Bohns sold KRVQ-FM, KVLI, and KCNQ to Alta Sierra Broadcasting, LLC for $300,000. However, the transaction triggered a complaint to the Federal Communications Commission (FCC) which held up the deal for three years. Calvary Chapel Costa Mesa, licensee of KWVE-FM, alleged that a time brokerage agreement (TBA) between the sellers and Alta Sierra constituted an unauthorized transfer of control because KRVQ-FM and KLVI had no staff on premises. The FCC agreed, levying an $8,000 fine against the Bohns in a consent decree. The penalty was later reduced to $6,000, and the sale closed in July 2017.

On June 23, 2016, KRVQ-FM went silent.

References

External links

Mass media in Kern County, California
Radio stations established in 1992
1992 establishments in California